Neoplynes cytheraea is a moth of the family Erebidae. It was described by Herbert Druce in 1894. It is found in Mexico.

References

 

Phaegopterina
Moths described in 1894